Emu Creek is the name of:

Creeks
 Emu Creek (Broken River), tributary of Broken River in Queensland, Australia
 Emu Creek (Brisbane River), a tributary of the Brisbane River in Queensland, Australia
 Emu Creek (Condamine River), a tributary of the Condamine River in Queensland, Australia
 Emu Creek (Lynd River), tributary of Lynd River in Queensland, Australia
 Emu Creek (Morehead River), tributary of Morehead River in Queensland, Australia
 Emu Creek (Kennedy River), tributary of Kennedy River in Queensland, Australia
 Emu Creek (Suttor River), tributary of Suttor River in Queensland, Australia
 Emu Creek (Walsh River), tributary of Walsh River in Queensland, Australia

Places
 Emu Creek, Queensland, a locality in the Toowoomba Region, Australia
 Emu Creek Station, a pastoral lease in Western Australia
 Emu Creek, Victoria a locality in the City of Greater Bendigo

See also
Aurukun, Queensland